Lactarius trivialis is a species of mushroom belonging to the genus Lactarius. The fungus is most commonly found in Scandinavia. The colour of the mushroom's cap can range from a light brown colour, to dark purple. The species has a total of five subtaxa. It was discovered and first recorded in the year 1838 by Elias Magnus Fries, in his book, Epicrisis Systematis Mycologici.

See also 
 List of Lactarius species

References 

trivialis
Fungi described in 1838
Taxa named by Elias Magnus Fries